The Langå–Struer railway line is a  long standard-gauge single-track railway line in Denmark which runs through the central Jutland region between Langå and Struer.

The section from Langå to Viborg opened in 1863, the section from Viborg to Skive in 1864 and the section from Skive to Struer in 1865. The line is owned and maintained by Rail Net Denmark and served with intercity trains by the Danish State Railways (DSB) and regional trains by Arriva.

History 

The Langå-Struer Line was the second railway line to open in Northern Jutland after the Aarhus–Randers line which opened in 1862.

The line was constructed by the civil engineering partnership Peto, Brassey and Betts for the Danish state. The section from Langå to Viborg opened on 21 July 1863. The section from Viborg to Skive opened on 17 October 1864 and the section from Skive to Struer on 17 November 1865. The construction was influenced by the Second Schleswig War in 1864 which delayed the opening of the sections west of Viborg.

In 2003, operation of the regional rail services on the Langå-Struer Line were transferred from DSB to the public transport company Arriva.

Operations

Regional trains 
The railway company Arriva runs frequent regional train services from Aarhus Central Station to Struer station.

InterCity service 
The Danish State Railways (DSB) operates two daily InterCity connections between Copenhagen and Struer.

Stations 
  (Lg) 
  (Up)
  (Bj)
 
  (Vg)
  (Sp)
  (Sm)
  (Hø)
  (Sk) 
  (Vp)
  (Str)

See also
 List of railway lines in Denmark

References

Notes

Bibliography

External links 

 Banedanmark – government agency responsible for maintenance and traffic control of most of the Danish railway network
 DSB – largest Danish train operating company
 Arriva – British multinational public transport company operating bus and train services in Denmark
 Danske Jernbaner – website with information on railway history in Denmark

Railway lines in Denmark
Railway lines opened in 1863
Railway lines opened in 1864
Railway lines opened in 1865
Rail transport in the Central Denmark Region